IT Chauraha is an elevated metro station located in the Red Line of the Lucknow Metro in Lucknow, India. It was opened to the public on 08 March 2019.

Station layout

Entry/Exit

References

Lucknow Metro stations